Reasonability is a legal term. The scale of reasonability represents a quintessential element of modern judicial systems and is particularly important in the context of international disputes and conflicts of laws issues. The concept is founded on the notion that all parties should be held to a reasonable standard of conduct and has become embedded in a number of international conventions such as the UNIDROIT principles and the CISG.

The earliest recorded use of the term reasonability goes back to Roman times. The Romans became known for their methods in assessing an individual's conduct according to the scale. It became common practice to attribute a "reasonability" score between 1 and 5, where 5 would indicate that a party had acted reasonably and would be entitled to the full sympathy of the court.

References

Legal terminology